Anthony Thembinkosi Bonga Mdletshe  was an Anglican bishop in South Africa at the end of the 20th century and the start of the 
21st.

He was dean of Grahamstown from 1992 to 1993 then  suffragan bishop of Grahamstown from 1993 to 1997; and bishop of Zululand from 1997 until 2005.

Notes

20th-century Anglican Church of Southern Africa bishops
21st-century Anglican Church of Southern Africa bishops
Anglican bishops of Zululand
Deans of Grahamstown
Year of birth missing (living people)
Living people